Ali ibn Ahmad was the ninth Emir of Crete, reigning from .

The surviving records on the internal history and rulers of the Emirate of Crete are very fragmentary. He is tentatively identified as a son of the seventh emir, Ahmad ibn Umar, and as the great-great-grandson of the conqueror of Crete and founder of the emirate, Abu Hafs Umar.

He was possibly the ruler of Crete in 949, when a large-scale, seaborne Byzantine expedition was sent against Crete, only for it to be comprehensively defeated by the Cretan Saracens.

References

Sources
 
 

10th-century Arabs
10th-century rulers in Europe
Emirs of Crete
Arab people of the Arab–Byzantine wars
People from Crete